Walker King (born Marylebone 24 May 1798 –  died Stone, Kent 20 March 1859) was Archdeacon of Rochester from 6 July 1827 until his death.

The son of Walker King, Bishop of Rochester, he was educated at Oriel College, Oxford and Rector of Stone, Kent. His son was Bishop of Lincoln.

References

1798 births

1859 deaths
People educated at Dulwich College

Alumni of Corpus Christi College, Cambridge
Archdeacons of Rochester